James Griffiths (1856 – 12 April 1933) who served as minister of the Baptist churches at Calfaria, Llanelli and Calfaria, Aberdare.

Early life
Griffiths was born in Pencoed in 1856, the third of thirteen children. At the age of twelve he was baptized and became a member of the congregation at the Baptist church at Blackmill. In early life, he worked as a weaver before enrolling as a student at Pontypool Baptist College in 1879.

Ministry at Llanelli
In 1883, Griffiths was ordained as minister at Calfaria, Llanelli, where he remained for seven years. During his time at Llanelli, he built a reputation as a minister.

Ministry at Aberdare
In February 1889, Griffiths preached at Calfaria, Aberdare, where there was a vacancy following the death of its long-serving minister, Thomas Price the previous year. Later that year he received a unanimous call to become his successor at Calfaria. He was inducted as minister at special services held on Christmas Day 1889.

In 1898 the Welsh Baptist Union held its annual assembly at Calfaria, and in 1903 a new organ was purchased at a cost of £850.

Griffiths later wrote the church's centenary history in 1912. Membership stood at 537 in 1899 with a slight decline to 420 by 1916 and 396 in 1925.

Later years
In 1923, Griffiths was elected president of the Baptist Union of Wales. He retired from his pastorate in 1930 at the age of 74.

Griffiths died on 12 April 1933 and was buried at Blackmill.

References

Sources

Books and Journals

19th-century Welsh Baptist ministers
1856 births
1933 deaths
People from Bridgend County Borough
20th-century Welsh Baptist ministers